is a public park in Kita, Tokyo, Japan.

Facilities
 Baseball fields (2, night games allowed)
 Tennis courts (2 hard courts, night games possible)
 Open space
 Play equipment
 Cycling course (for children)
 Sowa Pond
 Central Park Cultural Center
 Central Library

Access
 By train: 15 minutes’ walk from Ōji Station.

See also
 Parks and gardens in Tokyo
 National Parks of Japan

References

 Website of Kita City (in Japanese)

External links
 Website about Central Park Cultural Center (in Japanese)
Parks and gardens in Tokyo